The Australia men's national soccer team represents Australia in international men's soccer. Officially nicknamed the Socceroos, the team is controlled by the governing body for soccer in Australia, Football Australia, which is affiliated with the Asian Football Confederation (AFC) and the regional ASEAN Football Federation (AFF).

Australia is the only national team to have been a champion of two confederations, having won the OFC Nations Cup four times between 1980 and 2004, as well as the AFC Asian Cup at the 2015 event on home soil. The team has represented Australia at the FIFA World Cup tournament on six occasions, in 1974 and from 2006 to 2022. The team also represented Australia at the FIFA Confederations Cup four times.

History

Early years

The first Australia national team was constituted in 1922 for a tour of New Zealand, which included two defeats and a draw. For the next 36 years, Australia, New Zealand and South Africa became regular opponents in tour (exhibition) matches. During that period, Australia also competed against Canada and India during their tours of Australia in 1924 and 1938 respectively. Australia recorded their worst ever defeat on 30 June 1951 as they lost 17–0 in a match to a touring England side. Australia had a rare opportunity to compete on the world's stage during the team's first major international tournament as hosts of the 1956 Melbourne Olympics. However, an inexperienced squad proved to be reason for the team's disappointing performance. With the advent of cheap air travel, Australia began to diversify its range of opponents. However, its geographical isolation continued to play a role in its destiny for the next 30 years. Australia won the 1967 South Vietnam Independence Cup against seven other nations, but this gained little recognition domestically.

After failing to qualify for the FIFA World Cup in 1966 and 1970, losing in play-offs to North Korea and Israel respectively, Australia finally appeared at their first World Cup in West Germany, 1974. After managing only a draw from Chile and losses from East Germany and West Germany, the team which was made up of mostly amateur players was eliminated at the end of the first round, finishing last in their group without scoring a goal. It would prove to be the only appearance for the Australian team until the World Cup tournament returned to Germany more than three decades later in 2006. Over a 40-year period, the Australian team was known for its near misses in its attempts to qualify for the World Cup; they lost play-offs in 1966 to North Korea, 1970 to Israel, 1986 to Scotland, 1994 to Argentina, 1998 to Iran and 2002 to Uruguay.

First successes and "golden generation"
The team's previously poor record in World Cup competition was not reflected in their reasonable performances against strong European and South American sides. In 1988, Australia defeated reigning world champions Argentina 4–1 in the Australian Bicentennial Gold Cup. In 1997, Australia drew with reigning world champions Brazil 0–0 in the group stage and then defeated Uruguay 1–0 in the semi-finals to reach the 1997 FIFA Confederations Cup Final. In 2001, after a victory against reigning world champions France in the group stage, Australia finished the 2001 FIFA Confederations Cup in third place after defeating Brazil 1–0 in the third-place decider. Australia defeated England 3–1 at West Ham United's Boleyn Ground in 2003 as Wayne Rooney made his international debut.

In early 2005, it was reported that Football Australia had entered into discussions to join the Asian Football Confederation (AFC) and end an almost 40-year association with the Oceania Football Confederation (OFC). Many commentators and fans, most notably soccer broadcaster and former Australian captain Johnny Warren, felt that the only way for Australia to progress was to abandon Oceania. On 13 March, the AFC executive committee made a unanimous decision to invite Australia to join the AFC. After the OFC executive committee unanimously endorsed Australia's proposed move, FIFA approved the move on 30 June 2005. Australia joined Asia, with the move taking effect on 1 January 2006, though until then, Australia had to compete for a 2006 World Cup position as an OFC member country.

After a successful campaign, the team took the first steps towards qualification for the 2006 World Cup. After coach Frank Farina stood down from the position after Australia's dismal performance at the 2005 Confederations Cup, Guus Hiddink was announced as the new national coach. Australia, ranked 49th, would then have to play the 18th ranked Uruguay in a rematch of the 2001 qualification play-off for a spot in the 2006 World Cup. After a 5–0 friendly win against Jamaica, the first leg of the play-off tournament was lost (1–0), with the return leg still to be played in Australia four days later in Sydney on 16 November 2005.

The second leg of the qualifying play-off was played in front of a crowd of 82,698 at Stadium Australia. Australia led Uruguay 1–0 after 90 minutes following a goal by Mark Bresciano in the first half. The aggregate was tied, and extra time was played. Neither team scored after two periods of extra time, bringing the game to a penalty shootout. Australia won the penalty shootout (4–2), making Australia the first ever team to qualify for a World Cup via a penalty shootout. Australian goalkeeper Mark Schwarzer made two saves, with John Aloisi scoring the winning penalty for a place in the World Cup, Australia's first qualification in 32 years.

Australia went into the 2006 World Cup as the second lowest-ranked side. Although their ranking vastly improved in subsequent months after a series of exhibition matches against high-profile teams, including a 1–1 draw against the Netherlands, and a 1–0 win at the sold-out 100,000 capacity Melbourne Cricket Ground against the then European champions Greece., for the 2006 World Cup, Australia was placed into Group F, along with Japan, Croatia and defending champions Brazil. In their opening group game, Australia defeated Japan 3–1, with Tim Cahill scoring two goals (84', 89') and John Aloisi scoring one (90+2') in the last eight minutes. Their goals made history, being the first ever scored by Australia's men's soccer team in a World Cup and it was also the first victory of an Oceania team in World Cups, as well as all three goals being scored in the last seven minutes of the game, which was never before done in a World Cup match. Australia met Brazil in their second group game, which Australia lost to Brazil 2–0. Australia faced Croatia in their third match. The final score (2–2) was enough to see Australia proceed to the round of 16, where they were eliminated from the competition after a 1–0 defeat by the eventual champions Italy after conceding a controversial penalty in the 93rd minute. The loss marked the official end of Hiddink's tenure as Australia's national coach. The success achieved at the 2006 World Cup later saw the team named AFC National Team of the Year, as well as being dubbed the "golden generation" in the history of the Socceroos.

Later success
Led by coach Graham Arnold, Australia went to their first Asian Cup in 2007, sending a strong squad which included 15 players from the previous year's World Cup team. In Group A they played against Oman (1–1 draw), Thailand (4–0 win) and eventual champions Iraq (3–1 loss), assuring Australia's progression to the quarter-final stage of the tournament. Though after drawing 1–1 with Japan after extra time, Australia exited the tournament on penalties at the quarter-final stage. An international friendly on 11 September 2007 against Argentina (1–0 loss) was Graham Arnold's last game as head coach, with the position eventually being filled by Pim Verbeek on 6 December 2007.

Australia began their 2010 World Cup campaign in the third round of qualification, drawn into a group, composed of Qatar, Iraq and China PR, in which Australia finished first. Australia eventually saw progression through to the 2010 World Cup after comfortably winning the fourth round of qualification in a group consisting of Japan, Bahrain, Qatar and Uzbekistan. Australia's qualification was already assured before the final two games, finally topping its group ahead of Japan by five points.

Australia was drawn into Group D in the 2010 FIFA World Cup, which featured three-time world champion Germany, Ghana and Serbia. On 14 June 2010, Australia faced Germany. Pim Verbeek's surprising decision to play without a recognised striker saw Australia comprehensively defeated 4–0. Verbeek received heavy criticism for his tactics, with SBS (Australia's World Cup broadcaster) chief soccer analyst Craig Foster calling for his immediate sacking. Australia's second group match against Ghana resulted in a draw of 1–1, and their third and final group match against Serbia resulted in a 2–1 win. Ultimately Australia's heavy loss to Germany saw them eliminated in the group stage. Pim Verbeek completed his term as Australian coach at the end of the 2010 World Cup and was soon replaced by Holger Osieck.

In 2010, Australia qualified for their second AFC Asian Cup, topping their qualification group. A successful campaign at the 2011 AFC Asian Cup saw Australia become runners-up to Japan, after losing in the Final 1–0 in extra time.

In 2012, Australia agreed to compete in the East Asian Cup. Australia travelled to Hong Kong to compete in a series of qualification matches with the hopes of qualifying for the 2013 East Asian Cup. Despite handing several debuts and fielding an in-experienced squad, Australia was successful, finishing ahead of Hong Kong, North Korea, Guam and Chinese Taipei to progress to the 2013 East Asian Cup, where Australia eventually finished last behind Japan, South Korea and China PR. On 26 August 2013, Australia became full members of the ASEAN Football Federation but as part of their entrance agreement with the sub-confederation, their national team is barred from participating in the AFF Championship due to their perceived wide gap in playing standards between Australia and the rest of the region.

 Australia's 2014 FIFA World Cup qualification began with a series of friendlies against the United Arab Emirates (0–0), Germany (1–2 win), New Zealand (3–0 win), Serbia (0–0) and Wales (1–2 win). Australia's World Cup campaign started in the third round of qualification, with Australia topping their group to progress to the fourth round. After winning their last fourth round-game, Australia finished as runners-up in their group, qualifying for the 2014 FIFA World Cup on 18 June 2013.

Shortly after achieving qualification to the World Cup, Australia played a series of friendly matches against Brazil and France, suffering consecutive 6–0 defeats. This along with previous poor performances during the 2014 World Cup qualification campaign resulted in manager Holger Osieck's sacking, bringing his four-year tenure as Australia's manager to an end.

New generation: the 2015 Asian Cup triumph
After a two-week search for a new manager, Ange Postecoglou was eventually appointed in the position. Postecoglou was tasked with regenerating the Australian national team, which was deemed to have been too reliant on members of their Golden Generation of 2006, subsequently leading to a stagnation of results, culminating in successive 6–0 defeats to Brazil and France. In his first game as Australia's manager, a home friendly match against Costa Rica, Australia won 1–0 courtesy of a goal from Tim Cahill.

For the 2014 World Cup, Australia were drawn in Group B alongside reigning Cup holders Spain, 2010 runners-up Netherlands and Chile. Their first match was off to a lacklustre start, having conceded two goals in the opening 15 minutes from Alexis Sánchez and Jorge Valdivia. Despite a goal from Tim Cahill that inspired a late resurgence from Postecoglou's team, they ultimately lost to Chile 3–1. Their second match against the Netherlands was a close one, but their efforts ended in a 3–2 loss, thus earning their early exit along with the Spanish team. Australian fans praised the team for their outstanding efforts in a tough group. In the end, Australia finished Group B with a third, consecutive defeat to world champions Spain, 3–0. Australia's competitive World Cup performances in a difficult group lead to believe that a new Golden Generation was about to begin.

In their first international match proceeding the World Cup, Australia played World Cup quarter-finalists Belgium in Liège, with Australia going down 2–0. Four days later, Australia achieved their first international win in ten months, and just their second win under Ange Postecoglou, with a 3–2 victory over Saudi Arabia in London. After drawing against the United Arab Emirates, and suffering successive losses against Qatar and Japan, combined with previous poor results earlier in the year, Australia slipped to 94 and 102 in the FIFA World Rankings, their lowest ever ranking.

The new year saw Australia host the 2015 AFC Asian Cup, with the team making their third consecutive appearance in the tournament. Australia won their first two group matches against Kuwait and Oman comfortably, with scorelines of 4–1 and 4–0 respectively. This guaranteed their qualification for the knockout stage, despite losing their final group match against South Korea in Brisbane 1–0. They faced China PR in the quarter-finals and won 2–0, courtesy of a second-half brace from Tim Cahill. In the semi-finals, Australia won 2–0 over the United Arab Emirates and advanced to the final for the second time in a row. They faced South Korea in the final on 31 January at Stadium Australia, winning 2–1 after extra time to claim their first Asian title and qualify for the 2017 FIFA Confederations Cup.

After Australia qualified for the 2018 FIFA World Cup, Ange Postecoglou resigned from his position as coach; and former manager of the Netherlands national team, Bert van Marwijk, was subsequently appointed as his replacement. On 8 March 2018, after van Marwijk's first squad announcement, the FFA announced that Graham Arnold will take the coaching role from after the 2018 FIFA World Cup until the 2022 FIFA World Cup.

With van Marwijk, Australia was grouped with Denmark, France and Peru. The first match of Australia against eventual world champions France was praised by a valiant effort, in which Australia only lost 1–2 by a virtual own goal from Aziz Behich. After the defeat to France, Australia produced another outstanding performance, drawing Denmark 1–1. However, in the crucial match against already eliminated Peru, Australia lost 0–2 and crashed out from the World Cup with only a point, became the only team from the AFC to be winless in the 2018 FIFA World Cup. Subsequently, van Marwijk left his post and Arnold came to replace him as the new coach of the Socceroos.

Under Graham Arnold, Australia started their 2019 AFC Asian Cup in hope of defending the title, being grouped with Jordan, Syria and Palestine, but their hope was shattered by a shocking 0–1 defeat to Jordan. Australia soon returned to the race by beating Palestine 3–0 before winning an important encounter with a hard-fought 3–2 win over Syria, eliminating both Palestine and Syria in the process. The win gave Australia to qualify for the round of sixteen, where they overcame Uzbekistan after winning on penalties 4–2, having drawn 0–0 for 120 minutes. In the quarter-finals, however, in the Hazza bin Zayed Stadium, the place where Australia had lost their opening match against Jordan, Australia once again failed to register any win in the same ground, losing to the host United Arab Emirates 0–1 due to a mistake from Miloš Degenek, eventually failing to defend the title.

2022 World Cup resurgence
Australia took part in the 2022 FIFA World Cup qualification, which they entered in the second round, in which they faced Kuwait, Jordan, Nepal and Chinese Taipei. Australia  dominated the group with eight wins out of eight to reach the third round, where it faced Saudi Arabia, Japan, China, Oman and Vietnam. After a good start with three straight wins over China, Vietnam and Oman, Australia then won only one game, against Vietnam, in their final seven games, being held thrice and losing thrice, finishing third in the group. It then had to rely on fourth round playoffs. Due to the COVID-19 pandemic, all of Australia's playoffs were centralised in Doha. The Socceroos began their quest with a 2–1 win over the United Arab Emirates, to face fifth place CONMEBOL qualification finisher Peru, a rematch of the 2018 FIFA World Cup. This time around, Australia held Peru goalless, before winning on penalties to make it to the 2022 FIFA World Cup. Australia was drawn in group D along with world champions France, Denmark and Tunisia. Australia's qualification also meant that the Asian confederation had the largest number of teams in their World Cup history, with six countries qualifying.

As preparation for the World Cup, Australia played two friendlies against neighbouring New Zealand, winning both games. It began its World Cup quest on 23 November against world champions France, losing 4–1 despite initially taking the lead with  goal from Craig Goodwin. Three days later Australia registered its first World Cup win since 2010, overcoming Tunisia with a header from Mitchell Duke to seal a 1–0 win, sending Australia from bottom to second place. Four days later, against UEFA Euro 2020 semi-finalists Denmark, Australia won 1–0, thanks to a Mathew Leckie goal. Australia finished the group stage in second place behind France on goal difference, making Australia the first Asian representative to reach the knockout stage in Qatar 2022. Australia's resurgence in the group stage was widely watched and followed by Australian supporters. Mass celebrations occurred after the upsets over Tunisia and Denmark, and Prime Minister Anthony Albanese called it "magnificent". In the round of 16, Australia lost 2–1 to Argentina, with Lionel Messi opening the scoring and Julián Álvarez getting the second after dispossessing Mathew Ryan. Australia pulled one back when Goodwin's shot deflected into goal off Enzo Fernández and Garang Kuol almost scored the equaliser in injury time, but his shot was smothered by Argentinian goalkeeper Emiliano Martínez.

Team image

Media coverage
Australian matches are broadcast by Paramount+ and on free-to-air by Network 10.

Previous coverage has been provided by Fox Sports (2018–2021), Ten network on its 10 Bold channel, ABC, SBS until 2016 and Nine on its 9Go! channel (2016–2017).

The national team has set multiple ratings records for both subscription and free-to-air television. Australia's final 2006 World Cup qualifying match against Uruguay was the highest rating program in SBS history with an audience of 3.4 million viewers, while a 2010 World Cup qualifying match against Uzbekistan set a record for the highest subscription television audience, with an average of 431,000 viewers. The 2015 Asian Cup Final against South Korea had a total reach of 5.3 million Australians overall.

Kit 

Australia's first kit was sky blue with a maroon hoop on the socks, the colours representing the states of New South Wales and Queensland, a look that was reminiscent of the Australian national rugby league team's strips of the period. They wore the predominantly light blue kit until 1924 when they changed to green and gold.

Australia has worn a yellow jersey, usually accompanied by green shorts, and yellow socks since the 1960s. The colour of the socks altered throughout the 1970s, 1980s, and 1990s from white to the same green as the shorts to the same yellow colour as the jersey. This peculiarity of the uniform refers to exactly the combination of colours used in it: although the country's flag has the colours blue, red and white, the selection uses shades of green and yellow. That's because, unlike many national teams, who base their colours on the flag, the Australian team uses as a base the colours of a typical plant in the country, the acacia, which has green leaves and yellow flowers.

Their current away kit is a turquoise shirt with a gold stripe on either side of the shirt, the coat of arms being on top of a navy background. It is accompanied by navy shorts (also containing the gold stripes) and turquoise socks. Australia's kits have been produced by manufacturers including Umbro, Adidas, KingRoo, and since 2004 by Nike.

Rather than displaying the logo of Football Australia, Australia's jersey traditionally features the coat of arms of Australia over the left breast. The team first wore the traditional green and yellow colours in 1924. Australia's 1974 World Cup kits were produced by Adidas as were all other national team kits in the tournament, with Adidas sponsoring the event. The kits, however, contained Umbro branding, due to the manufacturer's Australian partnership at the time. Nike renewed the kit manufacturer deal with FFA for another 11 years in 2012, handing them the rights to make national team kits until 2022. In the lead-up to the 2014 World Cup, the new kits to be worn by the team were revealed. The design of the new kits included a plain yellow shirt with a green collar, plain dark green shorts and white socks, a tribute to the 1974 Socceroos. Inside the back of the neck also had woven the quote, "We Socceroos can do the impossible", from Peter Wilson, the captain of the 1974 Australian team. This kit was well received. In March 2016, FFA revealed the new Socceroos kit, which featured a yellow jersey, yellow shorts and green socks. This was reportedly in accordance with a FIFA directive, instructing all national teams to have matching shirts and shorts. This kit was met with wide public contention, primarily due to the colour change of the shorts from the traditional green to yellow.

Kit suppliers

Nickname

Australia's nickname, "Socceroos", was coined in 1967 by Sydney journalist Tony Horstead in his coverage of the team on a goodwill tour to South Vietnam during the Vietnam War. It is commonly used by both the Australian people and the governing body, the FFA. The nickname represents a cultural propensity for the use of colloquialisms in the country. It also represents the Australian English use of the sport's name.

The name itself is similar to most other Australian national representative sporting team nicknames; used informally when referring to the team, in the media or in conversation. Similarly, the name is derived from a well-known symbol of Australia, in this case, the kangaroo. The words soccer and kangaroo are combined into a portmanteau word as soccer-roo; such as Olyroos for the Australia Olympic soccer team or Hockeyroos for the Australian national women's hockey team.

Rivalries

Australia's longtime rivals are trans-Tasman neighbours New Zealand. The two teams' history dates back to 1922, where they first met in both their international debuts. The rivalry between the Socceroos and the All Whites (New Zealand) is part of a wider friendly rivalry between the neighbours Australia and New Zealand, which applies not only to sport but to the culture of the two countries. The rivalry was intensified when Australia and New Zealand were both members of the OFC, regularly competing in OFC Nations Cup finals and in FIFA World Cup qualifications, where only one team from the OFC progressed to the World Cup. Since Australia left the OFC to join the AFC in 2006, competition between the two teams has been less frequent. However, the rivalry between the two teams is still strong, with the occasional match receiving much media and public attention.

After joining the AFC, Australia began to develop a fierce rivalry with fellow Asian powerhouse Japan. The rivalry began at the 2006 World Cup, where the two countries were grouped together. The rivalry continued with the two countries meeting regularly in various AFC competitions, including the 2011 Asian Cup final and qualification for the 2010, 2014, 2018 and 2022 World Cups.

Another major rival within Asia is South Korea, who Australia came up against in three World Cup qualification campaigns in the 1970s and, since joining the AFC, have met regularly including the victory by Australia in the 2015 Asian Cup final.

Supporters
The main supporter group of the Australian national team is Socceroos Active Support (SAS). SAS was founded in January 2015 as an independent group, who uses social media to organise and keep in touch. This replaced the former active support group Terrace Australis, who were founded by Football Federation Australia and fans in 2013, during Australia's 2014 World Cup qualification campaign. Its establishment came in the wake of poor off-field action and minimal community engagement. Previously, the emergence of Terrace Australis saw the Green and Gold Army relinquish its role as a hub for active support, which it had claimed since its establishment in 2001. Since the 2015 AFC Asian Cup triumph, the supporters had encouraged people in Australia to focus more on the national team, and the nation's soccer pride.

Home stadium
Australia does not have a dedicated national stadium, instead the team plays at different venues throughout the country for exhibition or tournament purposes. In recent years, major international matches have usually been rotated around various large grounds, including Stadium Australia in Sydney, Hunter Stadium in Newcastle and Docklands Stadium in Melbourne. International matches have also been played at the Melbourne Cricket Ground and Melbourne Rectangular Stadium in Melbourne and Canberra Stadium in Canberra.

Australia historically played at the Gabba in Brisbane, which hosted Australia's first international match on home-soil on 9 June 1923, a 2 to 1 win over New Zealand.  It was the fourth Australian team match overall, but the first three internationals had been played at New Zealand in 1922.  Other historic venues which regularly hosted international home matches include Olympic Park Stadium in Melbourne as well as the Sydney Cricket Ground, Sydney Sports Ground, Sydney Showground, Sydney Football Stadium in Sydney and Subiaco Oval in Perth.

In England, the Socceroos have also played several "home" games previously at Craven Cottage in Fulham (Fulham Football Club's home ground), and Loftus Road in Shepherd's Bush (Queens Park Rangers' home ground), owing to the fact there is a large Australian expatriate community in West London, and that a high proportion of the senior team play in European leagues.

Recent results and fixtures

The following is a list of match results from the previous 12 months, as well as any future matches that have been scheduled.

2022

2023

Coaching staff

Players

Current squad
The following 26 players were called up for two friendlies against Ecuador on 24–28 March 2023.

Caps and goals correct as of 4 December 2022, after the game against Argentina.

Recent call-ups
The following players have been called up within the last 12 months.

 PER Withdrew due to personal reasons
 INJ Withdrew due to injury
 RET Retired

Records

Australia currently hold the world record for the largest win and the most goals scored by a player in an international match. Both records were achieved during the 2002 FIFA World Cup qualification match against American Samoa on 11 April 2001. Australia won 31–0 with Archie Thompson scoring 13 goals and David Zdrilic scoring 8. Two days before the 31–0 win, Australia broke the record for largest win with a 22–0 win over Tonga. With 13 and 8 goals respectively, both Thompson and Zdrilic broke the previous record jointly held by another Australian, Gary Cole, who scored seven goals against Fiji in 1981, and Iranian Karim Bagheri, who also scored seven goals against Maldives in 1997.

Most capped players

Top goalscorers

Most clean sheets

Competitive record

FIFA World Cup

FIFA Confederations Cup

AFC Asian Cup

Summer Olympics

OFC Nations Cup

AFC–OFC Challenge Cup

AFF Championship

Since joining the AFF in 2013, Australia has never competed in this event.

Minor tournaments

All-time record

FIFA Rankings

Last update was on 17 February 2023
Source:

 Best Ranking   Worst Ranking   Best Mover   Worst Mover

Honours

Major:

 FIFA Confederations Cup
Runners-up: 1997
Third place: 2001
 AFC Asian Cup
Winners: 2015
Runners-up: 2011
 OFC Nations Cup
Winners: 1980, 1996, 2000, 2004
Runners-up: 1998, 2002

Other:

AFC Men's Team of the Year: 2006, 2015

Invitational Tournaments:

  1967 South Vietnam Independence Cup – Winners
  1988 Australia Bicentenary Gold Cup – Runners-up

See also
 Australia women's national soccer team
 Soccer in Australia
 List of Australian national soccer team captains
 Australia 31–0 American Samoa
 Trans-Tasman Cup

Notes

References

External links

 
 Australia at FIFA

Australia national soccer team
AFC Asian Cup-winning countries
Oceanian national association football teams
Asian national association football teams
1922 establishments in Australia
Soccer in Australia
National sports teams established in 1922